Members of the New South Wales Legislative Assembly who served in the 11th parliament of New South Wales held their seats from 1882 to 1885.
Elections for the eleventh Legislative Assembly were held between 30 November and 21 December 1882 with parliament first meeting on 3 January 1883.  The Assembly was expanded to 113 members elected in 40 single member electorates, 26 two member electorates, 3 three member electorate and 3 four member electorates. The parliament had a maximum term of 3 years and was dissolved on 7 October 1885 after 33 months. The Premiers during this parliament were Sir Alexander Stuart until 7 October 1885 and then George Dibbs. The Speaker was Edmund Barton.

See also
Stuart ministry
First Dibbs ministry
Results of the 1882 New South Wales colonial election
Candidates of the 1882 New South Wales colonial election

Notes
There was no party system in New South Wales politics until 1887. Under the constitution, ministers were required to resign to recontest their seats in a by-election when appointed. These by-elections are only noted when the minister was defeated; in general, he was elected unopposed.

References

Members of New South Wales parliaments by term
19th-century Australian politicians